Statistics of the Brunei Premier League football for the 2002 season.

Overview
It was contested by 16 teams, and DPMM FC won the championship.

First stage

Group A

Group B

Second stage

References

External links
Brunei 2002 (RSSSF)

Brunei Premier League seasons
Brunei
Brunei
1